The Gay Intruders is a 1948 comedy film directed by Ray McCarey and released by 20th Century Fox.

Premise 
John and Maria are successful onstage but have marriage problems offstage. Their talent manager convinces them to consult to married psychiatrists Dr. Matson and Dr. Nash separately. As John and Maria's relationship begins to sweeten, the doctors' relationship begins to sour.

Cast 
Tamara Geva as Maria Ivar
John Emery as John Newberry
Leif Erickson as Dr. Harold Matson
Virginia Gregg as Dr. Susan Nash
Roy Roberts as Charles McNulty
 Si Wills as Arthur
Harry Lauter as the male secretary
 Marilyn Williams as the female secretary
Sara Berner as Ethel

References

External links 
 

1948 films
1948 comedy films
American comedy films
20th Century Fox films
Films scored by Raoul Kraushaar
American black-and-white films
Films directed by Ray McCarey
1940s American films